A cochlearium (plural cochlearia) was a small Roman spoon with a long tapering handle.

History
Cochlearia have been found in a number of Roman sites from the 4th and 5th centuries CE, including the Thetford and Hoxne Hoards.

The word cochlea literally means spiral or snail shell, leading many to conclude that the spoon was designed so that the handle could be used to extract snails or cockles out of the shell.

The Roman terms cochlearium, cochlear, and cochleare denote a liquid measure of a spoonful. A cochlearium was also a place where snails could be bred for eating.

References

See also

 Cignus
 Silver spoon
 Cochlea, the spiral-shaped part of the human inner ear

Spoons
Latin words and phrases